Duffy (also Texas) is an unincorporated community in Ohio Township, Monroe County, Ohio, United States.

Notes

Unincorporated communities in Monroe County, Ohio
Unincorporated communities in Ohio
Ohio populated places on the Ohio River